Alma mater (pl. [rarely used] ) is an allegorical Latin phrase used to identify a school, college or university that one formerly attended or graduated from.

Alma mater is also a honorific title for various mother goddesses, especially Ceres or Cybele. Later, in Catholicism, it became a title of Mary, mother of Jesus.

The term entered academic use when the University of Bologna adopted the motto Alma Mater Studiorum ("nurturing mother of studies"), to celebrate the university's historic status as the oldest and longest continuously operating university in the world.

The term is related to alumnus, literally meaning a "nursling" or "one who is nourished", that frequently is used for a graduate.

Etymology

Although alma (nourishing) was a common epithet for Ceres, Cybele, Venus, and other mother goddesses, it was not frequently used in conjunction with mater in classical Latin. In the Oxford Latin Dictionary, the phrase is attributed to Lucretius in his De rerum natura where he used the term as an epithet to describe an earth goddess:
Denique caelesti sumus omnes semine oriundi
omnibus ille idem pater est, unde alma liquentis
umoris guttas mater cum terra recepit (2.991–993)
We are all sprung from that celestial seed,
all of us have same father, from whom earth,
the nourishing mother, receives drops of liquid moisture

After the fall of Rome, the term came into Christian liturgical usage in association with Mary, mother of Jesus. "Alma Redemptoris Mater" is a well-known eleventh century antiphon devoted to Mary.

The earliest documented use of the term to refer to a university in an English-speaking country is in 1600, when the University of Cambridge printer, John Legate, began using an emblem for the university press. The first-known appearance of the device is on the title-page of a book by William Perkins, A Golden Chain, where the Latin phrase Alma Mater Cantabrigia ("nourishing mother Cambridge") is inscribed on a pedestal bearing a nude, lactating woman wearing a mural crown.

In English etymological reference works, often the first university-related usage is cited as 1710, when an academic mother figure is mentioned in a remembrance of Henry More by Richard Ward.

Special use
Many historic European universities have adopted Alma Mater as part of the Latin translation of their official name. The Latin name of the University of Bologna,  (nourishing mother of studies), refers to its status as the oldest continuously operating university in the world. Other European universities, such as the Alma Mater Lipsiensis in Leipzig, Germany, or Alma Mater Jagiellonica, Poland, have used the expression similarly in conjunction with geographical or foundational characteristics. At least one, the Alma Mater Europaea in Salzburg, Austria, an international university founded by the European Academy of Sciences and Arts in 2010, uses the term as its official name.

In the United States, the College of William & Mary in Williamsburg, Virginia, has been called the "Alma Mater of the Nation" because of its ties to the founding of the country.

At Queen's University in Kingston, Ontario, and the University of British Columbia in Vancouver, British Columbia, the main student government is known as the Alma Mater Society.

Monuments

The ancient Roman world had many statues of the Alma Mater, some still extant (e.g., at the Palatine Hill in Rome).

Modern sculptures of Alma Mater are found in prominent locations on several American university campuses, most notably, a bronze statue of Alma Mater by Daniel Chester French situated on the steps of Columbia University's Low Library; the University of Illinois Urbana-Champaign also has an Alma Mater statue that was created by Lorado Taft. Supporters of Washington University commissioned a sculpture for its affiliate Mary Institute by Cyrus Dallin in 1925. An altarpiece mural in Yale University's Sterling Memorial Library, painted in 1932 by Eugene Savage, depicts the Alma Mater as a bearer of light and truth, standing in the midst of the personified arts and sciences.

There is an Alma Mater sculpture on the steps of the monumental entrance to the University of Havana, Cuba, which was based on the one at Columbia. The statue was cast in 1919 by Mario Korbel, with Feliciana Villalón Wilson as the inspiration for Alma Mater. It was installed in its current location in 1927, at the direction of architect Raul Otero.

References

External links
 
 
 Alma Mater Europaea website

School terminology
Latin words and phrases
Academic terminology